Lechaina is a town and a former municipality in Elis, West Greece, Greece. Since the 2011 local government reform it is part of the municipality Andravida-Kyllini, of which it is the seat and a municipal unit. The municipal unit has an area of 94.567 km2. It is situated 39 km north of the city of Pyrgos, and 60 km southwest of Patras. In 2011, its population was 4,855.

Geography

The area of the municipal unit Lechaina stretches from the flatlands on the Ionian Sea coast to the hills around the Pineios reservoir in the east. The main land use is agriculture. The lagoon Kotychi, connected with the Ionian Sea, is located in the northern part of Lechaina. Lechaina has a railway station on the line Patras-Kalamata. The principal streams are Andravida Creek and Melissos. The Greek National Road 9 Patras-Pylos runs through Lechaina.

Subdivisions
The municipal unit Lechaina is subdivided into the following communities (constituent villages in brackets):

History
Mid 20th century, an irrigation project increased agricultural production of Lechaina. Forest fires have caused damage in Lechaina, especially in 1993 and 2001. The 2008 Peloponnese earthquake also caused damage in Lechaina.

Population history

Notable people

Andreas Karkavitsas, writer

See also
List of settlements in Elis

References

External links

 
Populated places in Elis